Mehdi Mirdavoudi (Persian:  مهدی میرداوودی) (born September 11, 1977) is an Iranian heavyweight kick-boxer and a professional strongman, competing for Iran in international competitions.

He competed for Iran in K-1 World Grand Prix 2006 in Seoul.

He also competed in several internal and international strongman competitions. He participated two times (1998 & 2004) in Iran's Strongest Man competition and could reach the final in both times.

See also
K-1 World Grand Prix 2006 in Seoul
Iran's Strongest Man

References

External links
Mehdi Mirdavoudi page
 فدراسیون قویترین مردان آسیا
برگزاری مسابقات جهانی آماتور پرورش اندام

1977 births
Living people
Iranian male kickboxers
Heavyweight kickboxers
Iranian strength athletes
Iranian powerlifters
Heavyweight boxers